NOVA International School is an independent, university-preparatory, coeducational, day school that offers an educational program from pre-kindergarten (three-year-olds) through grade 12.

The school was founded in 1997, and the campus is situated in a residential neighborhood near the city center.

The school year is divided into two semesters and extends from late August to mid-June. During the year students have a one-week fall break (October), a three-week winter break, a shorter (February) break, and a one-week spring break (April).

Early Education Center (grades PK3-K) 

The youngest students study the International Early Years Curriculum (IEYC). This internationally recognised curriculum was developed with global best practice and the developmental needs of 2-6 year olds in mind. It supports key areas of learning through holistic enquiry and play-based approaches.

Elementary School (grades 1-5) 

NOVA Elementary School is an independent, co-educational international school comprising Grade 1 through Grade 5.  All instruction is delivered in English with Macedonian language and Macedonian culture and language being offered to elementary students too. The curriculum is based on the child-centred ‘International Primary Curriculum’ which is used by over 1000 schools worldwide.  The school also uses the US Common Core Standards as a reference for both Literacy and Numeracy.

Middle Years Programme (grades 6-10) 

The Middle Years Program (MYP) at NOVA prepares students for the Diploma Program.  Students in this program take courses from each of the eight subject groups.  Each year of the program students have at least one interdisciplinary learning experience. Students are also expected to be active participants in the community through service as action projects.  The program culminates in the personal project, an individual student project that allows students to showcase their ATL skills and personal learning passions.

Diploma Programme (grades 11-12) 

The IB Diploma Programme is a program that prepares 11th and 12th graders at NOVA for the academic rigor of university studies and beyond. Diploma candidates select six courses at either higher or standard level in each of the five groups, thus providing experience in the languages, social studies, the experimental sciences and mathematics. The program has three core requirements: the Extended Essay (EE), the Theory of Knowledge (TOK) course, and Creativity, Activity, Service (CAS). Students may opt for the Course candidacy pathway, rather than the full diploma. The program is taught over two years and has gained the recognition of many of the world’s leading universities. NOVA offers a variety of subject choices in each of the subject groups. Course offerings are listed in the IB handbook.

Organization 
The school is advised by a nine-member school board (two members are appointed by the U.S. Ambassador). The leadership includes the school’s founder, director, division principals, business manager and human resources manager. The school is also supported by a security team, facilities and ICT department, business and accounting office, administrative and admission office, and five counselors. NOVA International School is accredited by the Middle States Association of Colleges and Schools, Commission on Elementary and Secondary Schools (MSA-CESS); authorized by the International Baccalaureate Organization (IBO) by the College Board (testing services) and accredited by the Macedonian Ministry of Education. NOVA is a full member of the Central and Eastern European Schools Association (CEESA).

Curriculum  
The pre-kindergarten (three- and four-year-olds) curriculum is a play-based curriculum learning environment. The elementary school uses the American Education Reaches Out (AERO) standards, which are aligned with the U.S. Common Core state standards for literacy and numeracy. The program uses the International Primary Curriculum (IPC) standards for science and social studies. Specialty classes, such as art, music, dance, and physical education are included for students in grades K to 5. Art and music are taught and assessed based on the AERO standards, dance based on McRel standards and P.E. based on the SHAPE America’s national standards. Macedonian classes are offered K-5 for Macedonian citizens, and a cultural studies class is offered for non-Macedonian citizens where students learn more about the diversity of each other’s cultures. The secondary school offers the IB Middle Years (MYP) and Diploma (DP) Programs. Macedonian language classes are offered in grades 6-12, and foreign languages are part of the curriculum for grades 6-12, including: French, German, Spanish and Italian. The school uses Measures of Academic Progress (MAP) as well as the PSAT 8/9/10/11, to benchmark academic achievement and growth. The Center for Differentiated Learning (CDL) offers support for classroom integration of children with IEPs and pull-out interventions tailored to their specific needs. After-school activities are offered to all grades in sports (soccer, volleyball, basketball, baseball, tennis, gymnastics, cross-country, swimming), arts (drama, band, choir, ballet, hip hop), languages, math, science, robotics, knowledge bowl, and speech/debate. The school is home to SuperNOVA athletics; grades 6-12 participate in CEESA events and sports. The majority of NOVA graduates matriculate to higher education institutions in EU countries, the U.S., and Asia/Australia.

School facilities  

The school campus is composed of buildings dedicated to an early education center, elementary, lower secondary and upper secondary school. The outdoor spaces include three gated playgrounds, a small soccer field, a basketball court, and a large outdoor amphitheater. The entire campus offers wireless Internet. There are five science labs, three art rooms, two libraries, two full-service cafeterias, two indoor amphitheaters, two music studios, two dance studios, a drama room, an elementary gym, and a design studio. The school uses an adjacent sports and recreational center for its physical education classes, bigger events, and competitions. The school uses university science facilities for advanced lab work.

After school options

After school activities and clubs 

The school offers a varied program of After School Activities (ASA) throughout the school year. It covers a variety of sports, games and activities.  These are non-competitive activities offered to all NOVA students, intended to meet their interests and needs. After school activities are supervised by teachers, teacher assistants and volunteer parents. Activities offered include academic writing, art, baseball, basketball, tennis, band, ballet, hip-hop, chess, choir, band, drama, martial arts, yoga, young engineers, karate, jumping clay, and soccer.

Language Institute 
NOVA has developed the Language Institute (LI) which includes two programs of language learning: Mother-Tongue program and a World Language program. The languages that are currently offered as part of the LI program are: French, German, Mandarin, Italian, Russian, Beginning Macedonian and Spanish language and Albanian for native speakers.

SUPERNOVA Athletics and Activities 

As a full member of Central and Eastern European Schools Association (CEESA), NOVA sends SUPERNOVA teams to international CEESA tournaments and events, and hosts several of them throughout the school year. The activities that Nova students prepare for and participate in are international tournaments in soccer, basketball, volleyball, cross country, swimming, knowledge bowl, math, and robotics.

As of the current 2022-23 CEESA season, SUPERNOVA has been most successful in basketball, where the LSS boys team won their tournament, the LSS girls team won their tournament, and the USS boys team won their tournament.

Learning support 
Learning support is organized and provided as one-to-one tutoring and academic assistance, including homework support. Students in need of learning support are enrolled in this program following certain school procedures involving the students themselves, teachers and parents.

Day care 
Students cannot remain on campus after 15:15 unless they are enrolled in either an after school activity or day care. They can choose between either program, or do a combination of both.

Center for Differentiated Learning (CDL) 
The CDL works with students who have mild special learning needs.

Education in Skopje
High schools in North Macedonia
International high schools
Schools in North Macedonia
Educational institutions established in 1997
1997 establishments in the Republic of Macedonia